Juan Pablo Duarte is a Santo Domingo Metro interchange station on Lines 1 and 2. The Line 1 station was open on 22 January 2009 as part of the inaugural section of Line 1 between Mamá Tingó and Centro de los Héroes. The Line 2 station was open on 1 April 2013 as part of the inaugural section of Line 2 between María Montez and Eduardo Brito. The station is between Manuel Arturo Peña Batlle and Juan Bosch on Line 1, and between Juan Ulises García Saleta and Colonel Rafael Tomás Fernández on Line 2.

This is an underground station, built below the intersection of Avenida Máximo Gómez and Avenida John F. Kennedy. It is named to honor Juan Pablo Duarte.

References

Santo Domingo Metro stations
2009 establishments in the Dominican Republic
Railway stations opened in 2009